Anthony Katagas (born January 28, 1971) is an American film producer. He is an alumnus of Western New England University in Springfield, Massachusetts, where he majored in government and was captain of the lacrosse team as a goalie. He also represented Greece at the 2018 World Lacrosse Championship.

Katagas won an Academy Award for Best Picture for his role in producing 12 Years a Slave. Katagas' awards include a BAFTA, Golden Globe, Broadcast Critics' Choice Award, Independent Spirit Award and the Darryl F. Zanuck PGA Award for Best Picture. He has had four films nominated for the Palme d'Or and two films nominated for César Awards. His films have garnered nominations or awards from the DGA, SAG, National Board of Review, Gotham Awards, New York Film Critics, Los Angeles Film Critics and appeared on the prestigious AFI list for achievement in film.

In 1999, Katagas started Keep Your Head Productions, geared towards producing independent films in his hometown of New York City. Through Keep Your Head Productions, he has produced films by Michael Almereyda: Happy Here and Now (IFC Films, 2001), This So-Called Disaster (IFC Films, 2002), William Eggelston in the Real World (Palm Pictures, 2005) and Cymbeline (Benaroya Pictures, 2014). He also produced James Gray's, The Immigrant (The Weinstein Company, 2013), which competed for the Palme d'Or at the 2013 Cannes Film Festival and James Gray's The Lost City Of Z.

Filmography
He was a producer in all films unless otherwise noted.

Film

Production manager

Second unit director or assistant director

As an actor

Stunts

Thanks

Television

Production manager

Thanks

References

External links

Living people
American film producers
Producers who won the Best Picture Academy Award
Place of birth missing (living people)
Filmmakers who won the Best Film BAFTA Award
Golden Globe Award-winning producers
American people of Greek descent
Western New England University alumni
1971 births
Unit production managers